Collemopsidium is a genus of fungi in the family Xanthopyreniaceae. Some members of this genus are marine species, and described as "borderline lichens" or "algicolous" fungi. The genus was circumscribed by Finnish botanist William Nylander in 1881.

Species
 Collemopsidium angermannicum 
 Collemopsidium arenisedum 
 Collemopsidium caesium 
 Collemopsidium cephalodiorum 
 Collemopsidium chlorococcum 
 Collemopsidium foveolatum 
 Collemopsidium heardense 
 Collemopsidium iocarpum 
 Collemopsidium japonicum 
 Collemopsidium kostikovii  – Ukraine
 Collemopsidium mauritiae  – Mauritius
 Collemopsidium monense 
 Collemopsidium montanum 
 Collemopsidium ostrearum 
 Collemopsidium pyrenuloides  – Antarctica
 Collemopsidium subarenisedum 
 Collemopsidium sublitorale 
 Collemopsidium tasmanicum

References

Xanthopyreniaceae
Dothideomycetes genera
Taxa named by William Nylander (botanist)
Taxa described in 1881